The 1973 Basildon Borough Council election were the first elections to the newly created Basildon District Council took place on 7 June 1973 . This was on the same day as other local elections.  The Local Government Act 1972 stipulated that the elected members were to shadow and eventually take over from the predecessor corporation on 1 April 1974. The election resulted in Labour gaining control of the council.

Overall results

|-bgcolor=#F6F6F6
| colspan=2 style="text-align: right; margin-right: 1em" | Total
| style="text-align: right;" | 46
| colspan=5 |
| style="text-align: right;" | 30,607
| style="text-align: right;" | 
|-
|colspan="11" bgcolor=""|
|-
| style="background:"|
| colspan="10"| Labour win

Ward results

Barstable (3 seats)

Billericay (3 seats)

Burstead (3 seats)

Buttsbury (3 seats)

Castleton (4 seats)

Central (3 seats)

Fryerns East (3 seats)

Fryerns West (3 seats)

Laindon (4 seats)

Langdon Hills (3 seats)

Lee Chapel North (3 seats)

Pitsea (3 seats)

Vange (4 seats)

Wickford (4 seats)

References

1973
1973 English local elections
1970s in Essex